José Anderson de Oliveira Lessa (born July 26, 1989), best known as Anderson Lessa, is a Brazilian footballer. He plays as a striker for Central.

Career
Anderson began his career in  Náutico, which played for two years and was the top goalscorer in the league of Pernambuco sub 20 with 32 goals in 28 games. In 2010, he signed a contract with Cruzeiro, in the same year he was loaned to Newcastle United. Never went to Newcastle United and went on loan to Náutico, breaking the knee ligament in his second game as a starter. He will not return to play in 2011. He returned to Cruzeiro to recuperate from his injury. On 11 July 2011, he signed a season-long loan deal with Avaí.

Career statistics
(Correct )

References

https://globoesporte.globo.com/rj/serra-lagos-norte/futebol/campeonato-carioca/noticia/bangu-acerta-com-anderson-lessa-atacante-ex-cruzeiro-avai-e-nautico.ghtml

External links
 ogol
 sambafoot

1989 births
Living people
Sportspeople from Recife
Campeonato Brasileiro Série A players
Campeonato Brasileiro Série B players
Campeonato Brasileiro Série C players
Clube Náutico Capibaribe players
Cruzeiro Esporte Clube players
Avaí FC players
Villa Nova Atlético Clube players
Esporte Clube XV de Novembro (Piracicaba) players
Cuiabá Esporte Clube players
Agremiação Sportiva Arapiraquense players
Salgueiro Atlético Clube players
Central Sport Club players
Clube Atlético Bragantino players
Bangu Atlético Clube players
Association football forwards
Brazilian footballers
Associação Portuguesa de Desportos players
Al-Nasr SC (Kuwait) players
Kuwait Premier League players
Brazilian expatriate footballers
Expatriate footballers in Kuwait
Brazilian expatriate sportspeople in Kuwait
Esporte Clube Água Santa players